Kim Yeong-ok (born 4 March 1974 in Chuncheon, South Korea) is a South Korean former basketball player who competed in the 2004 Summer Olympics and in the 2008 Summer Olympics.

References

1974 births
Living people
South Korean women's basketball players
Olympic basketball players of South Korea
Basketball players at the 2004 Summer Olympics
Basketball players at the 2008 Summer Olympics
Sportspeople from Gangwon Province, South Korea
Asian Games medalists in basketball
Basketball players at the 2002 Asian Games
Asian Games silver medalists for South Korea
Medalists at the 2002 Asian Games
Beijing Great Wall players
Heilongjiang Dragons players
South Korean expatriate basketball people
South Korean expatriate sportspeople in China
Expatriate basketball people in China